Takhat Hazara (old name: Khajjiyan Wala) is a village near the Chanab River in the Sargodha District of Punjab, Pakistan.

When the Mughal king came to this place, he liked to stay here. His throne was set here. This place has seven doors around 80 km of the circle. Takhat Hazara and Takhat Mahal are the  two big and famous gates or doors to enter in Takhat Hazara or in Takhat Mahal, and that's why its name came Takhat Hazara. It is located at an altitude of 192 meters (633 feet). This is the town where Ranjha was born, the protagonist of the famous Punjabi folk story of Heer Ranjha.

References

Populated places in Sargodha District